The 1945 Women's Western Open was a golf competition held at Highland Golf & Country Club, which was the 16th edition of the event. Babe Zaharias won the championship in match play competition by defeating Dorothy Germain in the final match, 4 and 2.

Women's Western Open
Golf in Indiana
Women's Western Open
Women's Western Open
Women's Western Open
Women's sports in Indiana